Sue Fennessy (born 25 July 1968) is an Australian-born American entrepreneur. She is the founder and CEO of WeAre8, founder, largest shareholder, and former CEO of the Standard Media Index (SMI), the founder of  Frontiers Group LTD, and a fellow at Monash University.

Early life 
Sue Fennessy was born in Melbourne, Australia and matriculated to Monash University in 1989. There, she was the youngest student to attend their international program. Fennessy later founded the Global Discovery program, leading their New York initiative.

Career  
In 1989, during the course of her university studies, Fennessy founded MM Communications, an international sponsorship business based in Asia Pacific. It developed into a team of over 100 people and offices in 4 countries. The company was acquired by Omnicom in 2000.

In 2001, Fennessy founded Frontiers Group, a technology-driven sports and entertainment company that structured and negotiated the 2002 World Cup TV/digital rights as well as  spearheaded lifestyle television programming in China. She also negotiated for the first Western musicals, Cats and Les Miserables, to be staged in China.

In 2009, Fennessy founded and became CEO of Standard Media Index (SMI), leading the company until 2014. SMI is a globally recognized data aggregation business in the media industry. Operating out of in North America, APAC, and Europe, SMI is considered a preeminent global source of ad intelligence for media and finance companies including NBC, Disney, News Corporation, Google, Warner Media, CBS, UBS, Goldman Sachs, Deutsche Bank and Credit Suisse.

Fennessy is also the founder and CEO of WeAre8, The People's Platform. WeAre8 is a B-Corp  organisation meaning they are verified by B Lab to meet high standards of social and environmental performance, transparency and accountability. Sue is leading the mission to redirect billions of ad dollars going to social platforms back to people and the planet, all while delivering transformational results  for advertisers.With a unique view of the $450B digital advertising market, Sue became obsessed with the lack of effectiveness, transparency and waste in major digital platforms and the damaging effect this was having on content creators, people and the planet. WeAre8 has built the future of social media, and the first step enables people to reclaim their economic power by watching ads for just 2 minutes a day and getting valued and paid for their time. Celebrities are also bringing some of their best content to WeAre8 to inspire people to laugh and take simple fun actions to positively impact the world. Some investors in WeAre8 include Rio Ferdinand, Channel 4, and Centerstone Capital and in March 2022, WeAre8 signed a trading deal with media agency Dentsu in the UK & Ireland.

References

1968 births
Living people
Australian emigrants to the United States
Monash University alumni
Women founders
Social media